Robinson Molina (born 5 May 1997) is a Venezuelan swimmer. He competed in the men's 50 metre backstroke event at the 2017 World Aquatics Championships.

In 2014, he represented Venezuela at the 2014 Summer Youth Olympics held in Nanjing, China. In 2019, he competed in two events at the 2019 World Aquatics Championships held in Gwangju, South Korea.

References

External links
 

1997 births
Living people
Venezuelan male swimmers
Place of birth missing (living people)
Swimmers at the 2014 Summer Youth Olympics
South American Games bronze medalists for Venezuela
South American Games medalists in swimming
Competitors at the 2018 South American Games
Male backstroke swimmers
Competitors at the 2018 Central American and Caribbean Games
Central American and Caribbean Games medalists in swimming
Central American and Caribbean Games silver medalists for Venezuela
Central American and Caribbean Games bronze medalists for Venezuela
21st-century Venezuelan people